Provincial Route 8 is a  long paved highway located in Greater Buenos Aires, in the northeast of the province of Buenos Aires, in Argentina. It was part of National Route 8 (km 13.40 to 57.10) until 1988 and in 2017, there are still signs that indicate that this road is a national route.

References

Provincial roads in Buenos Aires Province